The Coyote Ugly Saloon is an American drinking establishment and the namesake of an international chain of bars, known for its bartenders dancing on the bar. It served as the setting for the 2000 movie Coyote Ugly.

History

The original Coyote Ugly Saloon opened January 27, 1993, in New York City, after New York University alumna Liliana Lovell declined an internship on Wall Street for a career as a bartender.

In 2001, the second Coyote Ugly Saloon opened in Las Vegas at the New York-New York Hotel & Casino, as a franchise operation. In 2002, a new company-owned bar opened in New Orleans' French Quarter. In 2003, Lovell relocated from New York City to New Orleans to run that bar and be involved in day-to-day corporate operations.

In 2004, the company opened additional corporate-owned locations in San Antonio and Austin, Texas, Nashville, Tennessee.  In 2005, the company opened additional corporate-owned locations in Denver, Colorado and in 2006 in Memphis, Tennessee. In June 2009, the first new Coyote Ugly in three years opened in Oklahoma City. 
Since then franchised bars in Tampa, Panama City Beach, Destin and Daytona Beach have opened in Florida. 
In 2009, Coyote Ugly began an international franchise program with a multi-unit license deal in Russia and opened their first franchised bar abroad in Moscow, Russia and another in Koblenz, Germany with a different party.  Following the Moscow opening, the franchisees in Russia opened in St. Petersburg, Russia in 2010 followed by Kazan, Russia in 2011.
In 2016 the first of the UK bars opened in Cardiff with bars now in Liverpool, Swansea and Birmingham. In August 2022 the newest bar will open in Camden, London.

In popular culture

Movie based on the company

The bar reached national prominence in 1997 when former bartender Elizabeth Gilbert wrote of her experiences in an article for GQ magazine, titled "The Muse of the Coyote Ugly Saloon".  Producer Jerry Bruckheimer's company bought the rights to the story from Lovell, and he produced the movie Coyote Ugly, based on the article. The film was shot on a set in Los Angeles, with exteriors filmed in Manhattan. Coyote Ugly opened in August 2000 with Maria Bello in the role of Lovell and Piper Perabo as an aspiring songwriter in New York City who becomes the newest "Coyote". It grossed more than US$110 million worldwide.

Other
From 2006 to 2008, CMT ran three seasons of The Ultimate Coyote Ugly Search produced by Touchstone Television. The first two seasons saw a group of prospective employees paired with a serving Coyote in the hope of getting a job at the bar and a cash sum for them and their partner. The final season changed the format with the contestants competing to get a place on the traveling Coyotes troupe – five Coyotes who could be booked to bar-tend and entertain at corporate, sports, and music events.

See also
 Bartop dancing

References

External links

 Coyote Ugly Saloon official website

Drinking establishments in Manhattan
East Village, Manhattan
Nightclubs in Manhattan
Theme restaurants
Film-themed restaurants
Regional restaurant chains in the United States
Restaurants established in 1993
1993 establishments in New York City